"Wondering" is a 1930s song written by Joe Werner and originally recorded by the Riverside Ramblers.  It is best known for the version recorded by Webb Pierce in 1951. It was Pierce's first number one on the Billboard country and western charts, topping the Country & Western Records Most Played By Folk Disk Jockeys chart for four weeks.

Charts

References
 

1930s songs
Webb Pierce songs
Year of song missing